Adv. Duma Gideon Boko  is a Motswana politician. He is a lawyer and jurist. He is the president of the main opposition party in Botswana and Botswana National Front (BNF). Adv Duma Boko & Dumelang Saleshando UDC campaigned in the 2019 elections on the following promises. 100,000 jobs in 12 months, A Living Wage of P3000, Old Age Pension of P1500, Free Sanitary Pads, Tablets For All Learners, Tertiary Education Student Allowance of P2500, Reopening BCL Mine.

Adv Duma Boko was born : lived and has formative education (primary to higher secondary, formal to hard knocks) in the dusty streets and windowless classrooms of Mahalapye. A typical Motswana from a typical ordinary Botswana family.

Adv Duma Boko was bred in the leftist leaning BNF and attained its presidency in 2010 leading the party to an opposition party named Umbrella For Democratic Change (UDC) which he again led to Botswana elections in 2014 and 2019 as its president. Adv Duma Boko is changing the Botswana opposition politics in packaging, policy, focus, branding and bringing the most credible challenge to the BDP. Due to the unfair and rigged 2019 elections by the Botswana Democratic Party (BDP). Adv Duma Boko has already started  campaigning for the 2024 elections. Umbrella For Democratic Change (UDC) has already won (2021/2022) council bye elections . Adv Duma Boko is encouraging voters to be more aware and protect their votes. As he said in a political rally December 21, 2021. "Le tshwanetse le nne madibela tlhopho lona. Tlhopho ya gago o e dibela ke namana. Tlhopho ya gago o e dibele ka botshelo jwa gago ka gore tlhopho ya gago e ama botshelo jwa gago".

Early life 
His father worked as a lecturer at Madiba Brigades. Duma's father died in 2004, after raising Duma and his sister Emma.

In 1987 Boko studied law at University of Botswana (UB). He was elected to the Student Representative Council (SRC). Among his law classmates were High Court judges Michael Leburu, Key Dingake, Bengbame Sechele and Lot Moroka. After graduating, in 1993, he furthered his studies at Harvard Law School.

Career 
He returned to teach Law at UB from 1993-2003, while operating a law firm. In the early 2000s Boko wrote a column in The Monitor in which he claimed that judges were not intellectually progressive. He expressed frustration that academics and judges were not doing enough research to make informed judgments.

Between 2005 and 2006 Boko was part of the legal team representing Basarwa who were challenging their relocation from the Central Kalahari Game Reserve (CKGR). The judgment that was passed on December 13, 2006 was a 50/50 outcome for both sides. In 2007 Boko defended two men facing the death penalty, Michael Molefhe and Brandon Sampson.

He was a member of the Law Society of Botswana (2006-2007). He was a member of the Board of Governors of Botswana Network on Ethics, Law and HIV-Aids. He was a member of the Boards of Directors of local Companies.

Publications 

 Boko, D.G. (1998) Towards a Compensatory Approach to Redressing Constitutional Violations in Botswana. The Zimbabwe Law Review (ZLRev), vol. 15, (pp. 120-133). UZ, Mt. Pleasant, Harare: Faculty of Law (UZ).
 Boko, D. G. (2002). Integrating the Basarwa under Botswana's Remote Area Development Programme: Empowerment or marginalisation?. Australian Journal of Human Rights, 8(2), 153-171.
 Boko, D.G. Fair Trial and the Customary Courts in Botswana: Questions on Legal Representation. Criminal Law Forum 11, 445–460 (2000). https://doi.org/10.1023/A:1016667617539

Politics 
Boko became the leader of the Botswana National Front (BNF) in 2010. His position and party membership was challenged on the grounds that when the BNF split in 2000, he had become a founding member of the National Democratic Front (NDF). If proven, this would, according to the BNF constitution, disqualify him from a leadership position in the party for three years after rejoining it. He prevailed in court. He inherited a party that was in decline under the leadership of Otsweletse Moupo.

The BNF came together with the newly formed Botswana Movement for Democracy (BMD), a splinter of the Botswana Democratic Party, and the Botswana Peoples Party to form the Umbrella for Democratic Change. Some BNF members were strongly against the coalition, arguing that the exercise would make their party disappear. Lawsuits against Boko and his central committee were filed before the High Court. Boko and the BNF won all the court challenges.

2014 General Elections
In the 2014 general elections, Duma Boko led UDC to a narrow win of the State House. UDC was the second largest party to win seats. Boko became the leader of the Opposition.

2019 General Elections
In the 2019 general elections, Duma Boko was soundly defeated by Anna Mokgethi of the BDP in the Gaborone Bonnington North constituency and as a result of his defeat, he was no longer the leader of opposition in the 12th National Assembly.

Claims of vote rigging in the 2019 general election
Duma Boko, claims there was massive vote rigging and fraud during the general election, by the BDP, to favour the current President, Mokgweetsi Masisi. The UDC lost the case with costs.

References

Living people
Members of the National Assembly (Botswana)
Botswana National Front politicians
Harvard Law School alumni
University of Botswana alumni
1969 births
People from Central District (Botswana)